Scaphyglottis bidentata is a species of orchid found in the American tropics from Costa Rica to northern Brazil.  It is the type species of the genus Hexisea, and was published before the generic epithet Scaphyglottis.  In a reversal of the usual rules for taxonomy, the genus Scaphyglotts was conserved against Hexisea when the two genera were combined.  The generic epithet Hexisea was retained as correct, however, in discussions limited to the species which had traditionally been placed in Hexisea.

References

bidentata
Orchids of Brazil
Orchids of Costa Rica